Neil Victor Humphrey (born 2 April 1973) is a former Jamaican cricketer.  Humphrey was a right-handed batsman.  He was born at Kingston, Surrey County, Jamaica.

Humphrey represented the Warwickshire Cricket Board in List A cricket.  His debut List A match came against the Leicestershire Cricket Board in the 2001 Cheltenham & Gloucester Trophy.  From 2001 to 2002, he represented the Board in 5 matches, the last of which came against Leicestershire in the 2002 Cheltenham & Gloucester Trophy.  In his 5 List A matches, he scored 128 runs at a batting average of 25.60, with a single half century high score of 58.

References

External links
Neil Humphrey at Cricinfo
Neil Humphrey at CricketArchive

1973 births
Living people
Sportspeople from Kingston, Jamaica
Jamaican cricketers
Warwickshire Cricket Board cricketers
Jamaican expatriates in England